All India Society for Electronics and Computer Technology (AISECT) is a social enterprise established in 1985 to take computer education to the rural and semi-urban masses. It was established by Santosh Choubey with a vision to bridge the ICT gap between rural and urban India. The organisation now operates in 28 states and four union territories of India, serving millions of people mostly in rural and semi-urban areas through its 23,000+ end-mile service delivery centres.

History 
The society was established by Santosh Choubey and a few other youths in 1985 when computers were new to India. Computers became more useful and popular over the years but the rural and semi-urban masses of India were being left out from India's economic and digital growth story. AISECT realising the need to bridge the ICT gap and started developing computer education content in regional languages, starting with Hindi. It started opening computer training centres in rural districts and blocks of Madhya Pradesh in the early nineties. After going through various reorganisations over the years, AISECT was officially registered as a society in the year 1997.

AISECT Initiatives 
AISECT organized the AISECT Women Achievers Summit 2016 on the occasion of International Women’s Day, focussing on women’s entrepreneurship. According to the Chairman of AISECT, Santosh Choubey, the organization has always encouraged women to be a part of the professional world and has actively supported women’s entrepreneurship ever since its launch three years ago. Today, a large number of women entrepreneurs are a part of AISECT and are operating their centres successfully. Moreover, women constitute around 50 percent of the workforce at AISECT. AISECT plans to continue to empower women in the future as well. During the concluding session of the summit,   film actress and theatre artist Ms. Tisca Chopra and Ms. Jayshree Kiyawat (Director, National Rural Health Mission) felicitated some of the most successful women entrepreneurs of AISECT as well as prominent women achievers of Bhopal for their distinguished work.

AISECT Group of Universities (AGU) 
AISECT Group of Universities is a renowned education group in India that offers a wide range of courses in various fields such as engineering, management, law, and education. With its state-of-the-art infrastructure and experienced faculty, the university provides quality education and practical training to its students. The university is dedicated to imparting knowledge and skills that enable students to become competent professionals and contribute to the growth and development of society. The group has a strong alumni network, and its graduates are well-placed in prestigious companies both in India and abroad. Overall, AISECT Group of Universities is a leading institution that provides quality education and prepares students for a bright future.

AISECT Group of Universities has several institutions under its banner, including:

 RNTU Bhopal: Rabindranath Tagore University is a private university in Bhopal, Madhya Pradesh that offers undergraduate, postgraduate, and research programs in various fields such as engineering, management, law, and more. The university has a student-centric approach to learning and provides students with a dynamic and engaging environment that fosters creativity and innovation. 
 Dr. C. V. Raman University, Chhattisgarh: Dr. CV Raman University, Chhattisgarh is a UGC-recognized university that offers programs in agriculture, engineering, management, education, and many other fields.
 Dr. C. V. Raman University Khandwa: Dr. CV Raman University, Khandwa is a state private university that provides courses in commerce, science, computer applications, and more.
 Dr. C. V. Raman University, Vaishali: Dr. CV Raman University, Vaishali is a private university in Bihar that offers undergraduate, postgraduate, and diploma programs in various fields.
 Aisect University Jharkhand: Aisect University Jharkhand is a private university in Jharkhand that offers courses in engineering, management, law, education, and more.

All of these institutions are dedicated to providing quality education and practical training to their students. They have state-of-the-art infrastructure, experienced faculty, and a student-centric approach to learning. With a strong focus on research and innovation, these universities are preparing students to become competent professionals and leaders in their respective fields.

References 

Information technology education
Educational organisations based in India
Educational institutions established in 1985
1985 establishments in Madhya Pradesh